The Buick LPGA Shanghai is a women's professional golf tournament in China on the LPGA Tour. It debuted in October 2018 at Qizhong Garden Golf Club in Shanghai.

Danielle Kang won the inaugural event by two strokes over seven golfers. Kang repeated as champion in 2019.

Winners

Tournament records

References

External links
Coverage on LPGA Tour's official site

LPGA Tour events
Golf tournaments in China
Sports competitions in Shanghai
Recurring sporting events established in 2018
2018 establishments in China